"Never Gonna Cry Again" is the debut single by the British new wave duo Eurythmics, released in 1981. It was taken from their debut album In the Garden.

Background
The single was a minor commercial success, peaking at #63 (for two weeks) in the UK.  It was the only single from Eurythmics' first album to chart. 

The number is about moving on from a breakup and was accompanied by a music video, a medium for which Eurythmics would later receive notable acclaim. 

The sleeve design of the single features an eerie picture of vocalist Annie Lennox made up to look like a gargoyle.

Co-produced by respected krautrock producer Conny Plank, the track also featured two members of the krautrock band Can.

"Never Gonna Cry Again" contains a flute solo performed by Lennox, one of the few times that she was to use the instrument in her pop career despite having studied it at the prestigious Royal College of Music in London in the 1970s.

The single's B-side, "Le Sinistre", is an experimental piece, featuring musical arrangements similar to those used in horror film scores.

Music Video
Never Gonna Cry Again was the first Eurythmics single to also have a promotional video. Filmed in February 1981 along the English South Coast, the video features a surreal tea party on the beach, prefaced by shots of Lennox emerging from the sea completely dry (achieved by reversing the film). 

Although Lennox (a classically trained flautist) played flute on the recording, the video shows Holger Czukay miming the flute part.  In addition to Czukay, the video also features Jaki Liebezeit (like Czukay, from the band Can).  Both Czukay and Liebezeit contributed to the original recording as session players. As Czukay and Liebezeit were not members of the British Musicians' Union, the video was unable to be shown on British TV.  The entire promo clip has to this date never been included in any official Eurythmics video release.

The shots of Lennox emerging in reverse from the water were later included on the Sweet Dreams (Are Made Of This) video album, where they were intercut with a live performance of the song "Jennifer". 

The low chart placement of the single meant that no video was produced for follow-up single "Belinda", which performed even worse on the UK Singles Charts.

Track listing
A: "Never Gonna Cry Again" (LP Version) - 3:02
B: "Le Sinistre" (Non-LP Track) – 2:47

Personnel

Eurythmics
Annie Lennox - keyboards, synthesizer, flute, vocals
David A. Stewart - bass guitar, guitar

Guest musicians
Holger Czukay (of Can) - French horn, walking
Jaki Liebezeit (of Can) - drums

Charts

References

1981 songs
1981 debut singles
Eurythmics songs
Songs written by Annie Lennox
Songs written by David A. Stewart
RCA Records singles